Amyas is a surname and male forename thought to be derived either from the Latin verb amare or the French city of Amiens.

People 
Sir Amyas Bampfylde (1560–1626), English politician and Member of Parliament for Devon in 1597
Amyas Borton (1886–1969), British air marshal
Amyas Connell (1901–1980), New Zealand architect
Amyas Godfrey, Canadian actor
Sir Amyas Morse, British auditor, Comptroller and Auditor General of the National Audit Office
Amyas Northcote (1864–1923), English writer
Amias Paulet (1532–1588), English diplomat

In literature 
 Amyas Burdett, architect and love interest in Call Dr. Margaret by Ray Dorien
 Amyas Crale, artist and victim of murder in Agatha Christie's crime-novel Five Little Pigs AKA Murder in Retrospect
 Amyas Leigh, protagonist in Westward Ho! by Charles Kingsley
 Amyas le Poulet, nicknamed Clarence, character in A Connecticut Yankee in King Arthur's Court by Mark Twain